The Xiheli Formation   is located in Wutai County. Shanxi Province. It contains grayish purple. purplish red slate, sandy slate and muddy sandstone. It has been dated to the paleoproterozoic period.

References

Geology of Shanxi
Geologic formations of China